Interatheriidae is an extinct family of notoungulate mammals from South America. Interatheriids are known from the Middle Eocene (Mustersan) to the Early Pliocene (Montehermosan). These animals were principally small-sized, occupying a habitat like hares, marmots and viscachas. The majority were very small, like rodents.

Interatheriidae is one of the mammal groups that best represent the fauna from the Santa Cruz Formation. Particularly Protypotherium with three species is characteristic of the formation: P. australe, P. praerutilum and P. attenuatum. Another well-known genus is Interatherium, particularly well represented by I. robustum.

References

Bibliography 
 
 McKenna, Malcolm C., and Bell, Susan K. 1997. Classification of Mammals Above the Species Level. Columbia University Press, New York, 631 pp.

Further reading 
 C. Villarroel and L. G. Marshall. 1989. A new fossil land mammal locality of late Miocene (Huayquerian) age from Muyu Huasi, southcentral Bolivia. Boletin del Servicio Geológico de Bolivia, Serie A IV(1):27-40

Typotheres
Eocene mammals
Oligocene mammals
Miocene mammals of South America
Ypresian first appearances
Pliocene extinctions
Fossil taxa described in 1887
Taxa named by Florentino Ameghino
Prehistoric mammal families